Shannonomyiella is a genus of parasitic flies in the family Tachinidae. There is one described species in Shannonomyiella, S. ortalidoptera.

Distribution
Brazil

References

Further reading

 
 
 
 

Phasiinae
Monotypic Brachycera genera
Insects described in 1939
Taxa named by Charles Henry Tyler Townsend
Diptera of South America